La fuga in maschera is a comic opera by Gaspare Spontini premiered in the Carnival season in Naples in 1800 at the Teatro Nuovo. The work was thought lost but found in 2007 and given its modern premiere at Jesi’s Teatro Pergolesi in 2012. The opera is scored for 2 oboes, 1 clarinet, 1 bassoon, 2 horns, strings and basso continuo.

Roles
Elena, daughter of Marzucco, betrothed to Doctor Filebo – Soprano
Olimpia, Elena's cousin, who lives in the same House, a spiritual woman with lofty ideas – Soprano
Coralline, a vagabond girl, betrayed in love by Doralbo – Soprano
Nardullo, clever peasant, and gracious brother of Coralline – Bass
Marzocco, fanatical painter – Bass
Nastagio, Servant of Marzucco – Bass
Doralbo, charlatan, known as Doctor Filebo – tenor

Recording
La fuga in maschera, DVD ; Elena – Ruth Rosique, Olimpia – Caterina Di Tonno; Corallina – Alessandra Marianelli; Nardullo – Clemente Daliotti; Marzucco – Filippo Morace; Nastagio – Alessandro Spina; Doralbo – Dionigi D’Ostuni.  I Virtuosi Italiani, Conductor – Corrado Rovaris, Production – Leo Muscato. Euro-Arts 2012, issued 2014

References

Operas
1800 operas
Operas by Gaspare Spontini